Strings of the World is a music festival in India focusing on string instruments, particularly bowed string instruments. It is conceptualised and directed by Sharat Chandra Srivastava

History
The first edition of Strings of the World was held on November 16 and 17, 2012 in Gurugram, India

Editions
So far there have been five editions of this festival:

 Edition I - November 16–17, 2012, Gurugram
 Edition II - November 22–23, 2013, Blue Frog, Delhi 
 Edition III - November 14–15, 2014, Garden of Five Senses, Delhi
 Edition IV - November 20, 2015, Gurugram
 Edition V - October 19, 2019, NCPA, Mumbai

Musicians
The following musicians/bands have performed in Strings of the World:

References

Music festivals in India